Renato Pasini (born 31 July 1977) is an Italian former cross-country skier who began competing in 1996. He won the gold medal in the team sprint (with Cristian Zorzi) at the 2007 FIS Nordic World Ski Championships in Sapporo. Pasini also has seven individual victories at various levels all in sprint since 2002.

Competing in two Winter Olympics, his best finish at the Winter Olympics was 18th in the individual sprint at Turin in 2006.

He has also finished second in the 2008–2009 Sprint World Cup.

Pasini competes also in ski mountaineering events, amongst others in the Trofeo Mezzalama race, in which he finished sixth in 2001, together with Luciano Fontana and Ivano Molin, and 10th together with his brother Fabio Pasini and Daniele Chioda in 2009.

Cross-country skiing results
All results are sourced from the International Ski Federation (FIS).

Olympic Games

World Championships
 1 medal – (1 gold)

World Cup

Season standings

Individual podiums
2 victories – (2 )
3 podiums – (3 )

Team podiums
4 podiums – (4 )

References

External links
 
 
 

1977 births
Living people
Italian male cross-country skiers
Italian male ski mountaineers
Cross-country skiers at the 2006 Winter Olympics
Cross-country skiers at the 2010 Winter Olympics
Olympic cross-country skiers of Italy
FIS Nordic World Ski Championships medalists in cross-country skiing
People from Gazzaniga
Sportspeople from the Province of Bergamo